Carlos Deltour (8 April 1864 – 29 May 1920), also known as Charles Deltour, was a Mexican-born French rower who competed in the 1900 Summer Olympics.

He was part of the French boat Rowing Club Castillon, which won the bronze medal in the 1900 Paris coxed pair. He was also a rugby union player of SBUC.

References

External links

Carlos Deltour's profile at databaseOlympics

1864 births
1920 deaths
French male rowers
Olympic rowers of France
Rowers at the 1900 Summer Olympics
Olympic bronze medalists for France
Olympic medalists in rowing
Medalists at the 1900 Summer Olympics
European Rowing Championships medalists
Sportspeople from Guadalajara, Jalisco
French people of Mexican descent
20th-century French people